The river sardine (Engraulicypris brevianalis or Mesobola brevianalis is an African species of freshwater fish in the family Cyprinidae. It is found in the Cunene, Okavango, upper Zambezi river systems and east coastal rivers from the Limpopo to the Umfolozi in northern KwaZulu-Natal. It is also known from the middle Luapula in Zambia. Engraulicypris gariepinus is sometimes considered conspecific.

References

Engraulicypris
Fish described in 1908
Taxa named by George Albert Boulenger